

Waormund was a medieval Bishop of Dunwich.

Waormund was consecrated between 816 and 824 and died between 824 and 825.

Notes

References

External links
 

Bishops of Dunwich (ancient)